Podagra is a monotypic moth genus of the family Noctuidae. Its only species, Podagra crassipes, is found in the US state of Arizona. Both the genus and species were first described by John Bernhardt Smith in 1902.

References

Amphipyrinae
Monotypic moth genera